= List of gliders (0–9) =

This is a list of gliders/sailplanes of the world, (this reference lists all gliders with references, where available) Note: Any aircraft can glide for a short time, but gliders are designed to glide for longer.

== 0-9 ==
=== 2nd Aviation Scouts ===
- 2nd Aviation Scouts Duja – A primary type constructed by the 2nd Aviation Scouts.

=== 20 Maj. ===
- 20. Maj Cavka
- 20.Maj Ilindenka
- 20.Maj Mačka
- 20.Maj Vrabac A
